Rasmus Harboe (25 October 1868 in Skælskør - 4 June 1952 in Frederiksberg) was a Danish sculptor. He was a frequent collaborator with several of the leading Danish architects of his time, including Martin Nyrop.

Early life and educatiobn
Harboe was born in Skælskør the son of ship-owner and industrialist Rasmus Jens Brændekilde Hilfgott Harbie (1828–96) and Olivia Sabine Rasmussen (1837–95). His dather owned Skælskør Steam Mill.

Harboe studied under Stephan Sinding from 18881. In 1891, he followed Sinding to Paris, where he remained until 1892. In 1898–99, he spent a year in Florence and Rpme pm a stipend from Anchers Legat. He was inspired by the country's Renaissance sculpture as well as by Greek art.

Career
Harboe had his debut at the Salon in Paris in 1892 and later exhibited at Charlottenborg in Copenhagen.

From 1907 until 1920, Harboe collaborated routinely with architects such as Martin Nyrop, Hack Kampmann and Martin Borsch, creating reliefs and other statuary for their buildings. He designed the Hercules Fountain at Vesterbros Torv in Copenhagen (1913–15) and created ceramic works for the porcelain manufacturer Aluminia.

The death of his wife Ellen Augusta Rohde (born 10 October 1870 in Copenhagen) on 3 December 1936 in Nykøbing Sjælland induced him to terminate his artistic career.

He and his wife are buried at Assistens Kirkegård in Copenhagen.

Personal life
Harboe married on 12 May 1910 in the Garrison Church Ellen Augusta Rohde (1870-1936), daughter of army officer Theodor Gudmann Rohde (1835–1924) and Ingeborg Johanne Ragnhilda Smidt (1842–1911).

Awards
Harboe received the Eckersberg Medal in 1914 and the Thorvaldsen Medal in 1948.

List of works

Public art
 Justitia, Old Town Hall, Gammeltorv, 4230 Skælskør (1896=
 Jens Vestergaard. Søanlægget, Søvej, Farsø (1907)
 Glæden ved genvundet helbred; Kærligheden mod de syge. Bispebjerg Hospital, Copenhagen (1913)
 Hercules Fountain, Vesterbros Torv, Copenhagen (1915)
 Philip Schou memorial, Smallegade 45, Frederiksberg, Copenhagen

Aluminias
 Tivoli figurines
 Columbine  figurine (1906)
Harlikin figurine (1906)
 Kassander figurine (1909)
 Pjerrot'' figurine
 Carnival figurines
 Boy with Monkey
Princess
Prince
Spannish Dancer
 Christimas relief (1024)

Gallery

References

Rxternal links

1868 births
1952 deaths
Recipients of the Eckersberg Medal
Recipients of the Thorvaldsen Medal
20th-century Danish sculptors
Male sculptors
19th-century sculptors
Danish male artists
20th-century Danish male artists